The 1969 Irish general election to the 19th Dáil was held on Wednesday, 18 June, following the dissolution of the 18th Dáil on 22 May by President Éamon de Valera on the request of Taoiseach Jack Lynch. The general election took place in 42 Dáil constituencies throughout Ireland for 144 seats in Dáil Éireann, the house of representatives of the Oireachtas, with boundary changes under the Electoral (Amendment) Act 1969. The governing Fianna Fáil won its fourth successive election.

The 19th Dáil met at Leinster House on 21 April to nominate the Taoiseach for appointment by the president and to approve the appointment of a new government of Ireland. Lynch was re-appointed Taoiseach, forming the 13th Government of Ireland, a single-party minority Fianna Fáil government.

Campaign

The general election of 1969 saw two new leaders of the two main parties fight their first general election. Jack Lynch of Fianna Fáil had become Taoiseach in 1966 and was attempting to win his first election. Liam Cosgrave had taken charge of Fine Gael in 1965 and was now leading his party into his first election. Brendan Corish was fighting his third general election as leader of the Labour Party.

Fianna Fáil had been in power since 1957, and in spite of media predictions the party was still very popular with the voters. Its leader Jack Lynch proved to be the party's biggest electoral asset. His quiet, easy-going and reassuring style, coupled with the catchy slogan "Let's back Jack!", attracted many new voters to Fianna Fáil. The party had introduced many innovative pieces of legislation during the 1960s and was now looking for a fresh mandate. Fianna Fáil were also helped by a deeply divided opposition.

Fine Gael had internal divisions. There was tension between the older conservative members, who wanted to keep the party as it was, and the younger deputies who wanted to move the party to the left. One of the party's policies proposed to abolish compulsory Irish for State examinations and civil service jobs. 

The Labour Party on the other hand were predicted to make gains after firmly ruling out a pre-election pact with Fine Gael. The party fielded a number of new, high-profile candidates, including Justin Keating, Conor Cruise O'Brien, David Thornley and Noël Browne. The slogan "The Seventies will be Socialist" was popular with Labour supporters; however, Fianna Fáil played the "red card", linking the Labour Party with communism. The tactic worked successfully.

Result

|}

The result marked a third successive victory for Fianna Fáil, led by Jack Lynch. Fianna Fáil and Fine Gael each lost votes, yet gained seats. Labour gained votes, yet lost seats. It was the last re-election of an Irish government for thirty-three years—until the Fianna Fáil-Progressive Democrats government was re-elected with an increased majority in the 2002 general election.

Voting summary

Seats summary

Government formation
Fianna Fáil formed the 13th Government of Ireland, a majority government, led by Jack Lynch as Taoiseach.

Changes in membership

First time TDs
A total of 37 TDs were elected for the first time:

Peter Barry
Michael Begley
Seán Brosnan
John Bruton
Liam Burke
Richard Burke
Hugh Byrne
Edward Collins
John Conlan
Ger Connolly
Gerard Cott
Bernard Cowen
Kieran Crotty
Conor Cruise O'Brien
Noel Davern
Barry Desmond
Tom Enright
Martin Finn
Garret FitzGerald
Paddy Forde
Billy Fox
Michael Herbert
Thomas Hussey
Liam Kavanagh
Justin Keating
Bill Loughnane
Gerard Lynch
Ray MacSharry
Tom McEllistrim
Michael J. Noonan
Michael O'Kennedy
John O'Sullivan
Paddy Power
Michael Smith
Frank Taylor
David Thornley
Jim Tunney

Re-elected TDs
Eugene Timmons

Outgoing TDs
Lionel Booth (Retired)
Paddy Clohessy (Retired)
Seán Collins (Lost seat)
John A. Costello (Retired)
Edward Cotter (Retired)
James Dillon (Retired)
Nicholas Egan (Retired)
John Fanning (Retired)
Denis Larkin (Retired)
Seán Lemass (Retired)
Patrick McAuliffe (Lost seat)
Seán MacEntee (Retired)
Michael O'Higgins (Defeated)
Patrick Tierney (Retired)

See also
Members of the 12th Seanad

Notes

References

Further reading
 

1969 elections in Europe
General election, 1969
1969 in Irish politics
1969
19th Dáil
June 1969 events in Europe